"Small Axe" is a song now credited to Bob Marley though the first releases credited Lee Perry and Bob Marley, and Perry says it was a collaboration. It was initially released in 1971 as a single by Lee "Scratch" Perry on his Upsetter Records label. It was rerecorded in 1973 for the album Burnin'. It has since been covered by several artists, among others Buju Banton, Deerhoof, Andrew Tosh, Greensky Bluegrass, The Aggrovators, U Roy, UB40, Trey Anastasio, and Peps Persson who made a Swedish version called "Liden såg" (little saw).

In the period when the song was written, virtually all the power in the Jamaican music industry was in the hands of Coxsone Dodd and Duke Reid, who represent the "big tree" that musicians would have to cooperate to cut down.

"Small Axe" was first recorded as a non-album single for Lee Perry and Martin Rodman and was later included on the album African Herbsman, a compilation of tracks from the sessions that produced the album Soul Revolution Part II. These tracks are regularly repackaged, re-titled and re-issued. 
"Small Axe" was also released on a single by Perry's Upsetter Records UK, Catalogue Number: US 357. It featured "All In One" on the flip. 
There is also a 1971 issue on the Upsetter label, Jamaica. This has a different flip side again, "Down the Road" by The Upsetters.
"Small Axe" was re-issued in 2013 on a US Upsetter 7-inch pressing with a different flip side, "Drum Version".

Small Axe was also the name of a CD issue 883717006523 in 2005 on the Pazzazz label. This features tracks from the Lee Perry sessions that spawned Soul Rebels and Soul Revolution Part II.

There is a confusion over the composition of "Small Axe", the Trojan-issued African Herbsman album crediting the song to Lee Perry, whereas the Island-issued Burnin album by The Wailers and U Roy's Virgin-issued DJ version both credit the song to Bob Marley. The 1971 Jamaican issue credits the song to both L. Perry and B. Marley. This discrepancy, which occurred on a lot of the Lee Perry material that was later re-recorded by Marley and the Wailers for Island Records, was one of the major sources of the feud that raged between Lee Perry and Island for most of the latter part of the 20th century.

The version heard on the Island album Burnin was re-recorded a few years later than the Lee Perry version and is credited to Chris Blackwell & The Wailers as producers.

References

Bob Marley songs
1973 songs
Diss tracks